Air Marshal Anil Chopra, PVSM, AVSM, VM, VSM is a retired Indian Air Force officer. Until December 2017, he was an Administrative Member of the Regional Bench of the Armed Forces Tribunal at Lucknow.

He is the father of journalist Shaili Chopra and his son-in-law is Shivnath Thukral.

Early life and career 
Born on 6 December 1952, Air Marshal Chopra is an alumnus of Sainik School, Kapurthala, from the batch of 1968. He passed out from National Defence Academy in 41 course. He was commissioned as a fighter pilot in the Indian Air Force on 2 June 1973. He retired from IAF on 31 December 2012 as Air Officer in charge Personal (AOP) in rank of air marshal.

Air Marshal Chopra safely ejected from a Mirage 2000 in February 2012, when the aircraft suffered an engine failure.

He had joined the Lucknow bench of the Armed Forces Tribunal on 7 October 2013. His term ended on 7 October 2017.

Awards and decorations

References 

1952 births
Living people
Indian Air Force air marshals
Indian Air Force officers
Indian aviators
Recipients of the Param Vishisht Seva Medal
Sainik School alumni
Recipients of the Ati Vishisht Seva Medal
Recipients of the Vayu Sena Medal